Dr Shesh Ghale is an Australian businessman of Nepalese origin, billionaire and the former president of Non Resident Nepali Association (NRNA). Based in Melbourne, Victoria, Ghale is the CEO of Melbourne Institute of Technology (MIT), which he co-founded with his wife, Jamuna Gurung.

Ghale and his wife, Gurung, are the third billionaires of Nepalese origin after Binod Chaudhary and Balkrishna.

Biography

Born in the western Nepal village of Lamjung, Ghale undertook his initial tertiary education in the former USSR (1979 to 1986) graduating with a Master of Civil Engineering degree from the Kharkiv National Automobile and Highway University. He undertook his studies on a Nepalese Government scholarship and, on returning to Nepal, worked as a highway project engineer for the Nepalese Government's transport department. Ghale relocated to Melbourne in 1990 to undertake further studies and to settle his family in Australia. He graduated from Victoria University in 1994 with a Master of Business Administration.

He is actively involved in Melbourne's business and commercial life and has a passionate commitment to education.

Ghale is the CEO and co-founder of the Melbourne Institute of Technology.

Net worth 
Ghale and his wife, Gurung, are the first billionaires in the global Nepalese diaspora and the only third billionaire of Nepalese origin after Binod Chaudhary and Balkrishna.

Ghale and Gurung first appeared on the BRW Rich 200 in 2009, and jointly appeared on subsequent rich lists. With a net worth of approximately A$1.18 billion in 2019, Ghale and Gurung were named by The Australian Financial Review Rich List as the 78th richest Australians. They were previously ranked as the 81st-richest Australian by The Australian Financial Review in the 2018 Rich List.

Note
 : Net worth held jointly with Jamuna Gurung.

Philanthropy 

Ghale is known both for his philanthropic work, especially in the aftermath of the April and May 2015 earthquakes in Nepal, as well as for his rise from an international student to his listing on the list of Australian billionaires. Following the 2015 Nepal earthquakes, as the president of NRNA International Coordination Council (ICC), Ghale led a well-coordinated relief and reconstruction activities. As a result, he and his wife spent much of the following years leading the campaign by stationing themselves closer to the ground zero of the devastating earthquake.

Some of his key achievements included service as the Honorary Consul General of Nepal in Victoria (1997-2000); nominated for the 2013 Ernst and Young Australian Entrepreneur of the Year Award; elected president of the Non-Resident Nepali Association (NRNA) for an inaugural two-year term (2013–2015) and re-elected for a second two-year term (2015–2017); awarded Doctor of the University Honoris Causa in 2015 by the Federation University in recognition of Ghale's distinguished service and contribution to Australian Higher Education, and to urban preservation and development, and of course to the people of Nepal; appointed "Special Envoy for Nepal Earthquake Reconstruction and Development" by the Government of Nepal in 2015; and in the same year appointed "Goodwill Ambassador for 2015-17" in the Male Leaders in the campaign against Domestic Violence by the Nepalese Ministry of Children, Women and Social Services.

In 2015, Ghale and Gurung co-founded the MIT Group Foundation to help under-privileged and vulnerable communities of Nepal through education and health. They have donated NPR रू1 billion to the Foundation.

References

External links
Shesh Ghale NepaleseAbroad.com

Year of birth missing (living people)
Living people
Nepalese businesspeople
People from Lamjung District
Australian chief executives
Nepalese emigrants to Australia
Victoria University, Melbourne alumni
Australian billionaires
21st-century Nepalese businesspeople
Nepalese company founders